Franco Troyansky (born 6 March 1997) is an Argentine professional footballer who plays for Lanús.

Career statistics

Honours
Atlas
Liga MX: Apertura 2021, Clausura 2022
Campeón de Campeones: 2022

References

External links

1997 births
Living people
Association football forwards
Argentine footballers
Argentine expatriate footballers
Olimpo footballers
Unión de Santa Fe footballers
San Lorenzo de Almagro footballers
Atlas F.C. footballers
Club Atlético Lanús footballers
Argentine Primera División players
Liga MX players
Argentine expatriate sportspeople in Mexico
Expatriate footballers in Mexico
Argentine people of Russian descent